Chelsea Cove is a census-designated place (CDP) located in the town of Beekman in Dutchess County, New York, United States. It was first listed as a CDP prior to the 2020 census.

Chelsea Cove is in southern Dutchess County, in the western part of Beekman, on the northern side of Sylvan Lake.

Demographics

References 

Census-designated places in Dutchess County, New York
Census-designated places in New York (state)